Lyme Center is an unincorporated community in the town of Lyme in Grafton County, New Hampshire, in the United States. The center of the village is listed on the National Register of Historic Places as the Lyme Center Historic District.

Lyme Center has a separate ZIP code (03769) from the rest of the town of Lyme.

References

Unincorporated communities in New Hampshire
Unincorporated communities in Grafton County, New Hampshire
Lyme, New Hampshire